Hepatization is conversion into a substance resembling the liver; a state of the lungs when gorged with effuse matter, so that they are no longer pervious to the air. Red hepatization is when there are red blood cells, neutrophils, and fibrin in the pulmonary alveolus/ alveoli; it precedes gray hepatization, where the red cells have been broken down leaving a fibrinosuppurative exudate.  The main cause is lobar pneumonia. Transformation from Red hepatization to gray hepatization is an example for acute inflammation turning into a chronic inflammation.

References

Further reading
Lectures on the diseases of the lungs and heart by Thomas Davies
Medical Times 1841
London Medical Gazette, December 8, 1843

Lung disorders